The Hypatian Codex (also known as Hypatian Letopis or Ipatiev Letopis;  ; ;) is a svod (compendium) of three letopis chronicles: the Primary Chronicle, Kievan Chronicle and Galician-Volhynian Chronicle. It is the most important source of historical data for southern Rus'. 

The codex was rediscovered in what is today Ukraine in 1617 by Zacharias Kopystensky, where it was copied by monks in 1621. It was re-discovered yet again in the 18th century at the Hypatian Monastery of Kostroma by the Russian historian Nikolay Karamzin.

The codex is the second oldest surviving manuscript of the "Initial svod" (Primary Chronicle), after the Laurentian Codex. The Hypatian manuscript dates back to ca. 1425, but it incorporates much precious information from the lost 12th-century Kievan and 13th-century Galician chronicles. The codex was possibly compiled at the end of the 13th century.

Since 1810, the codex has been preserved in the Russian National Library, St Petersburg. The language of this work is Old Church Slavonic with many East Slavisms.


Editions 
Complete Collection of Russian Chronicles, II.

See also
 Novgorod First Chronicle
 The Tale of Igor's Campaign

References

External links
Original text with extensive commentaries
 Hypatian Chronicle Encyclopedia of Ukraine

East Slavic chronicles
Lithuanian chronicles
15th-century manuscripts
Cyrillic manuscripts
East Slavic manuscripts